The Kitadani Formation ( Kitadani-sō) is a unit of Lower Cretaceous sedimentary rock which crops out near the city of Katsuyama in Fukui Prefecture, Japan, and it is the primary source of Cretaceous-aged non-marine vertebrate fossils in Japan. Dinosaur remains are among the fossils that have been recovered from the formation, but it also preserves a diverse assemblage of plants, invertebrates, and other vertebrates. Most, if not all, of the fossil specimens collected from the Kitadani Formation are reposited at the Fukui Prefectural Dinosaur Museum.

The Kitadani Formation is a unit within the Tetori Group, a major sequence of Lower Cretaceous rocks that is distributed across Fukui, Ishikawa, and Gifu prefectures of western-central Honshu. The Tetori Group exhibits marked lateral variation, and the Kitadani Formation is only present in Fukui Prefecture. The Kitadani Formation comprises interbedded tuffs, sandstones, and shales and reaches a maximum thickness of approximately one hundred meters (~328 feet). It conformably overlies the Akaiwa Formation and is unconformably overlain by the Omichidani Formation. The Kitadani Formation is significant because it is the major source of dinosaur fossils in Japan and because of Japan's unique position along the northeastern margin of Eurasia during the Early Cretaceous.

Geology 
The Kitadani Formation is a unit within the Tetori Group, a Lower Cretaceous sequence of predominantly sedimentary rock which crops out in the Fukui, Ishikawa, and Gifu prefectures of west-central Honshu, Japan in the region surrounding Mount Haku.

The formations present within the Tetori Group vary laterally, and the Kitadani Formation crops out only in the Kuzuryū River district of Fukui Prefecture. In this region, the sequence comprises, in ascending stratigraphic order: Gomijima Formation, the Kuwajima Formation, the Akaiwa Formation, and Kitadani Formation. The Kitadani Formation comprises alternating horizons of red-brown tuffs, blackish shales and sandstones, and thin coal beds. The sandstones within the Kitadani Formation are light gray and green and range in clast size from fine to coarse. The type section of the Kitadani Formation occurs along the Nakanomatadani branch of the  near the city of Katsuyama, where it is approximately 100 m (~328 feet) in thickness. The Kitadani Formation conformably overlies the Akaiwa Formation and is unconformably overlain by the Omichidani Formation.

The palaeoclimate during the deposition of the formation was noticeably warmer and drier than that of the older Kuwajima and Okurodani Formations, as evidenced by oxygen isotope records as well as by the presence of crocodylomorph fossils in the former in contrast to their absence in the latter.

The Kitadani Formation has had varying nomenclature throughout the history of its study. In the early stratigraphic literature on the Tetori Group, the Kitadani Formation was variably referred to as the "Lower part of the Omichidani Formation", the "Chinaboradani Alternation of Tuff, Shale, and Sandstone", the "Kitadani Alternation of Sandstone, Shale, and Tuff", and simply the "Kitadani Alternation" prior to its designation as a formation.

Age 
The Kitadani Formation was biostratigraphically dated to the late Barremian and early Aptian ages of the Early Cretaceous Epoch in 2002 based upon the presence of the freshwater bivalve Nippononaia ryosekiana. In 2005, part of the Kitadani Formation was biostratigraphically dated to the Barremian Age based upon the occurrence of the charophyte gyrogonite Clavator harrisii reyi in association with other charophytes. These biostratigraphic age assignments are supported by zircon fission track radioisotopic ages of tuff, which date the Kitadani Formation to 127-115 Ma.

Fossil assemblage

The Kitadani Formation preserves a diverse assemblage of plant fossils; invertebrate fossils; and vertebrate body and trace fossils, including mammals, turtles, neosuchian reptiles, and dinosaurs. Many vertebrate specimens from the Kitadani Formation are incomplete and poorly preserved, so taxonomic diversity is likely higher than it seems.

Plant fossils
The plant fossil assemblage of the Kitadani Formation is characterized by a rarity of ferns and an abundance of cycadales and conifers represented mostly by cones and shoots. A palynological study in 2013 resulted in the identification of greater than 40 species of spores, pollen grains, and plant fragments from the Kitadani Formation representing gymnosperms, freshwater algae, and epiphyllous fungus; however, no angiosperm pollen was identified. Branches of the conifer Brachyphyllum obesum have been recovered, which was interpreted to represent the warming and possible drying of the climate toward the upper Tetori Group. This interpretation is supported by the lack of plants from lower in the Tetori Group, such as ginkgos, in the Kitadani Formation.

Invertebrate fossils
The invertebrate fossil assemblage of the Kitadani Formation mostly comprises freshwater and brackish water bivalve and gastropod mollusks.

Vertebrate fossils

Mammalia
At least three mammalian taxa have been recovered from the Kitadani Formation, represented by rare teeth and partial jaws. In 2004, the spalacotheriid "symmetrodont" Symmetrolestes parvus was reported based upon a fragmentary right mandible with the first incisor and five postcanine teeth preserved. Two non-therian mammal specimens were reported in 2015, including an eobaatarid multituberculate and a triconodontid eutriconodontan. These specimens were noted as possessing non-tribosphenic dentition, and were interpreted being taxonomically distinct to closely related taxa from elsewhere in the Tetori Group, but neither specimen was named. The eobaatarid is represented only by a damaged left premolar.  The triconodontid is represented by a partial right dentary possessing a faint Meckelian groove.

Testudines
Turtles are represented mostly by shell fragments within the Kitadani Formation. In 2002, a preliminary evaluation of fragmentary specimens resulted in the identification of the taxa Adocus, Basilemys, and Trionychidae. A more recent evaluation of all 700+ turtle specimens from the Kitadani Formation was conducted in 2015. In that study, the authors concluded that the turtle assemblage of the Kitadani Formation consists of four trionychoid taxa and two other eucryptodires. In addition to the genera reported in 2002, Perochelys, Gobiapalone, Apalonina, and an unnamed nanhsiungchelyid were identified.

Eusuchia
A nearly complete skeleton of a goniopholidid eusuchian has been noted from the Kitadani Formation, but this material remains formally unpublished and unnamed. This specimen was discovered in 1982, and it was hypothesized to be closely related to Sunosuchus, Goniopholis, and Eutretauranosuchus based on a preliminary phylogenetic analysis.

Dinosauria
Dinosaurs are among the most well-known vertebrate taxa from the Kitadani Formation. Taxa from all three major dinosaurian clades — Theropoda, Sauropodomorpha, and Ornithischia — have been recovered.

Among theropods, two taxa have been named, with additional indeterminate dromaeosaurid and other theropod material also preserved. Fukuiraptor kitadanensis was reported in 2000 based upon a partial skull and associated partial postcranium. The phylogenetic relationships of Fukuiraptor are uncertain. Although confidently assigned to the Megaraptora, various phylogenetic analyses have suggested that megaraptorans may either be allosauroids, tyrannosauroids or non-tyrannosauroid coelurosaurs. Fukuivenator paradoxus was reported in 2016, and it is interpreted to be an early-diverging maniraptoran. However, its unique combination of ancestral and derived features associated with several different coelurosaurian clades precludes referral to a more exclusive clade than Maniraptora.

The titanosaurian sauropod dinosaur Fukuititan nipponensis was reported from the Kitadani Formation in 2010 based upon a single partial skeleton including cranial and postcranial material. Other indeterminate sauropod material is also preserved.

Ornithischian dinosaurs are represented in the Kitadani Formation by two named taxa and other indeterminate specimens, including an unnamed psittacosaurid ceratopsian. Fukuisaurus tetoriensis was named in 2003 based upon sparse cranial material, but more complete specimens have been recovered in the time since. Fukuisaurus is interpreted to be a non-hadrosauroid hadrosauriform. Another hadrosauriform Koshisaurus katsuyama was reported in 2015 and interpreted to be an early-branching hadrosauroid, not especially closely related to Fukuisaurus.

Additionally, non-avialan theropod, avialan theropod, sauropod, ornithischian tracks have been reported from the Kitadani Formation.

Dinosaur egg fragments have also been reported from the Kitadani Formation, including Plagioolithus fukuensis, a three-layered eggshell interpreted as a fossil avian egg. If indeed avian, Plagioolithus would represent the oldest known fossil bird egg.

See also 
 List of dinosaur-bearing rock formations

References

Geologic formations of Japan
Lower Cretaceous Series of Asia
Aptian Stage
Barremian Stage
Sandstone formations
Shale formations
Tuff formations
Coal formations
Coal in Japan
Fluvial deposits
Ichnofossiliferous formations
Ooliferous formations
Geography of Fukui Prefecture